Pegasid may represent:
 Pegasids - a meteor shower in July seemingly coming out of the Pegasus constellation
 Hot Jupiters - a class of exoplanets like the one around Pegasi 51 (51 Pegasi b)
 Pegasidae - a scientific family of fishes
 Pegasides - nymphs from Greek mythology
 Pegasi - mythical winged horses primarily from Greek mythology
 "Of Pegasus" - something originating from the mythical winged horse
 Pegasid Muses - English translation of the origin of Muses